E. kishinouyei  may refer to:
 Eumeces kishinouyei, the Kishinoue's giant skink, a lizard species found only in Japan
 Euchiloglanis kishinouyei, a synonym for Euchiloglanis davidi, a catfish species found in the Yangtze drainage in China

See also
 Kishinouyei (disambiguation)